Carol A. Gross is a professor of cell and tissue biology at the University of California San Francisco (UCSF). Her research focuses on transcriptional regulation in bacteria.

Before working at UCSF, Gross was a postdoctoral researcher and then faculty member at the University of Wisconsin Madison.

Awards 

 1992 Elected to the National Academy of Sciences 
 2011 Selman A. Waksman Award in Microbiology
 2016 Alice C. Evans Award, American Society for Microbiology

References 

University of California, San Francisco faculty
University of Wisconsin–Madison faculty
Members of the United States National Academy of Sciences
Cell biologists
Living people
Year of birth missing (living people)